Events in the year 1964 in Ireland.

Incumbents
 President: Éamon de Valera
 Taoiseach: Seán Lemass (FF)
 Tánaiste:  Seán MacEntee (FF)
 Minister for Finance: James Ryan 
 Chief Justice: Cearbhall Ó Dálaigh 
 Dáil: 17th 
 Seanad: 10th

Events
 3 January – Princess Margaret and Lord Snowdon arrived in Ireland from the UK for a seven-day visit.
 28 January – Families from Springtown Camp made a silent march through Derry to demand rehousing.
 21 February – The new Garda Síochána (police) training centre was opened in Templemore, County Tipperary.
 16 March – Taoiseach Seán Lemass arrived in London to make an official launch of "Ireland Week".
 21 March – Writer Brendan Behan's funeral took place in Dublin.
 23 May – President Éamon de Valera, Taoiseach Seán Lemass, and Tánaiste Seán MacEntee attended the official opening of the U.S. Embassy in Dublin.
 26 May – the Fine Gael parliamentary party approved Declan Costello's Just Society programme.
 1 June – Jill, a two-year-old elephant, arrived at Dublin Airport from India, heading for a new home at Dublin Zoo.
 5 September – Taoiseach Seán Lemass attended celebrations marking the silver jubilee of the first commercial transatlantic flight.
 18 December – The Cuban Minister for Industries, Che Guevara, was interviewed by Teilifís Éireann during a stopover at Dublin Airport. He was flying from New York to Algeria after a meeting of the United Nations General Assembly when his flight was diverted from Shannon Airport because of fog.
 The Lifford Bridge over the River Foyle was built, linking Lifford and Strabane.
 The death penalty was abolished for all but the murder of gardaí (police), diplomats, and prison officers.
 Myrtle Allen opened The Yeats Room restaurant at her home, Ballymaloe House, Shanagarry, County Cork.

Arts and literature
 19 September – The Abbey Theatre in Dublin closed in mourning for playwright Seán O'Casey who died the previous day of a heart attack in Torquay in England, aged 84.
 28 September – Brian Friel's play Philadelphia, Here I Come! opened at the Gaiety Theatre, Dublin.
 26 December – Micheál Mac Conmara and Eoghan Ó Tuairisc's pantomime on Irish folklore Aisling as Tír na nÓg opened at the Abbey Theatre.
 Val Doonican released his single "Walk Tall".
 John Montague published his story collection Death of a Chieftain.
 Seán Ó Ríordáin published his poetry collection Brosna.
 Eoghan Ó Tuairisc published his narrative poem The Weekend of Dermot and Grace and Lux Aeterna, including Hiroshima Mass.

Sports
 In the Inter-Cities Fairs Cup, Shelbourne F.C. were drawn against Portuguese side Belenenses and after two drawn games won the replay 2–1. Facing Atlético Madrid in the second round, they were beaten 1–0 in both legs.
 The horse Arkle won the Cheltenham Gold Cup and the Irish Grand National.

Births
 10 February – Richard Corrigan, chef.
 21 February – Keith Bailey, cricketer.
 23 February – Joseph O'Neill, writer.
 4 March
 Brian Crowley, Fianna Fáil MEP
 Pete Finnerty, Galway hurler.
 April – Ger FitzGerald, Cork hurler.
 10 May – Diarmuid Gavin, garden designer.
 26 May – Caitlín R. Kiernan, writer.
 1 June – Alan Lewis, cricketer, rugby referee.
 4 June – Michael Collins, novelist.
 13 June – Ciarán Lynch, Labour Party Teachta Dála (TD) representing Cork South-Central.
 18 June – Iarla Ó Lionáird, singer.
 26 June – Francis Hare, 6th Earl of Listowel, peer.
 7 July – Jennifer Gibney, actress
 21 July – Steve Collins, boxer.
 31 July
 Jim Corr, guitarist and keyboardist with The Corrs.
 Aengus Ó Snodaigh, Sinn Féin party TD for Dublin South-Central and Chief Whip.
 1 September – Ray D'Arcy, radio and television broadcaster.
 5 September – Liam O'Brien, association football player.
 1 October – John Sheridan, footballer born in England of Irish descent
 31 October – Colm Ó Cíosóig, drummer.
 7 November – Liam Ó Maonlaí, musician.
 17 November – Marina Carr, playwright.
 29 November – Tony Davis, Cork Gaelic footballer.
 15 December – Paul Williams, journalist and writer.

Full date unknown
 Mick Deegan, Dublin Gaelic footballer and manager.
 Martin Naughton, Galway hurler.
 Eddie O'Connor, Kilkenny hurler.
 Colm O'Neill, [ork Gaelic footballer.
 Derek Turner, journalist.

Deaths
 9 March – Frederick Jeremiah Edwards, recipient of the Victoria Cross for gallantry in 1916 at Thiepval, France (born 1894).
 20 March – Brendan Behan, poet, novelist and playwright (born 1923).
 29 April – J. M. Kerrigan, actor (born 1884).
 21/22 July – Paddy McLogan, former Sinn Féin party President, firearm accident (born 1899).
 18 September – Seán O'Casey, dramatist and memoirist (born 1880).
 27 September – Michael Donnellan, founder of the Clann na Talmhan party, and TD (born 1900).
 24 November
William O'Dwyer, judge, District Attorney and 100th Mayor of New York City (born 1890).
Des Dillon, former Clare, Dublin and Offaly hurler and Gaelic handballer (born 1926).
 November – Percy Redfern Creed, soldier, sportsman and writer (born 1874).
 31 December – Daniel Corkery, writer, teacher and Fianna Fáil Senator (born 1878).

See also
 1964 in Irish television

References

 
1960s in Ireland
Ireland
Years of the 20th century in Ireland